Haobam Paban Kumar is an Indian filmmaker from state of Manipur. Kumar's films and documentaries have been screened in several places across the globe.

Kumar's debut feature film Loktak Lairembee (Lady of the Lake) won the National Film Award for Best Film on Environment Conservation/Preservation at the 64th National Film Awards 2017.    He also won German Star of India at the 14th Indian Film Festival in Stuttgart, Germany for the film in 2017. 
Kumar's documentary AFSPA 1958 in 2006 was one of the highly critical and widely appreciated films across the globe for his daredevil attempt to showcase the harsh reality of the ill effects of Armed Forces Special Power Act in Manipur state.

Kumar’s other films The First Leap (2008), Mr India (2009) and Ruptured Spring (2012) have also been appreciated. Kumar's Phum Shang (Floating Life) on Loktak lake, the largest freshwater lake in northeast India which is characterized by its unique floating biomass, has also brought laurels for the filmmaker.  

He was the head of jury for non-feature films in the Indian Panorama section (51st International Film Festival of India).

Filmography

Feature & Documentary  films

References

External links 

Year of birth missing (living people)
Living people
Film directors from Manipur
Producers who won the Best Film on Environment Conservation/Preservation National Film Award